The Winchelsea Football & Netball Club, nicknamed the Blues, is an Australian rules football and netball club based in the town of Winchelsea, Victoria.

The club teams currently compete in the Geelong & District Football League, since 2002.

History
The Winchelsea Football Club was founded in 1876. 
It was a founding club of the Polwarth Football Association in 1923.
It was a founding club of the Bellarine Football League in 1971.
It played in the Colac & District Football League from 1983 to 2001.
It got admission to the Geelong DFL in 2002

Premierships
 1896, 1897, 1910, 1911, 1912, 1913, 1914, 1924, 1926, 1932, 1937, 1938, 1939, 1951, 1957, 1960, 1969, 1970, 1987.

Grandstand
The grandstand was designed by Walter Burley Griffin and is heritage listed.

Bibliography
 Cat Country - History of Football In The Geelong Region - John Stoward -

References

External links
 Facebook page

Geelong & District Football League clubs
Sports clubs established in 1876
Australian rules football clubs established in 1876
1876 establishments in Australia
Netball teams in Victoria (Australia)